Shaker Ahmed (born 1992) is a Bangladeshi cricket player. He is a bowler and was included in 2010 in the national squad for the 2010 Under-19 World Cup in New Zealand.

Shaker left Bangladesh in 2014 and went to the US. He has started playing in many tournaments in the US. He captained Cricket Academy of Detroit in Michigan. In January 2021, USA Cricket named Ahmed in a 44-man squad to begin training in Texas ahead of the 2021 Oman Tri-Nation Series.

References

1992 births
Living people
Bangladeshi cricketers
Sylhet Division cricketers
People from Sylhet